On 1 July 2008, a riot broke out in Ulaanbaatar, the Mongolian capital city. The riot was sparked by allegations of fraud surrounding the 2008 legislative election which occurred three days earlier. While initially a peaceful protest, the riot resulted in Mongolia's first state of emergency which lasted four days, and a military presence (lasting two of those days) was brought into the city to quell the riot. Five people were killed by the police, and the headquarters of the Mongolian People's Revolutionary Party (who had won the election) was set on fire. Additional suggested causes for the riot include a change to the electoral system which was not well understood, and an increased division between Mongolia's rich and poor population.

Background

In 2005 Nambariin Enkhbayar of the Mongolian People's Revolutionary Party (known as the MPRP and the former communist party) had been elected president, having defeating the Motherland-Democracy Coalition (known as the MDC, a coalition between the larger Democratic Party, the Mongolian New Democratic Socialist Party, and the Civil Will Party). In the 2004 legislative election the MPRP lost 36 of its 72 seats in the State Great Khural (35 of them to the MDC). Following the election the MPRP formed a coalition government with the MDC. In 2005 and 2006 five Democratic Party members changed parties; four members crossed the floor to the MPRP, whilst the Deputy Chairman (Lamjaviin Gundalai) began a new party (the People's Party), having blamed the Prime Minister for "slow economic growth". In early 2006 the MPRP was able to reform a government without the MDC coalition (with the four new members who had crossed the floor). In 2007 a new chairman of the MPRP was elected who sought to "uproot corruption and bureaucracy".

Before the 2008 election Gündalai returned to the Democratic Party, and most members of the People's Party ran as Democrats. Key issues in the upcoming election were updating the large agriculture industry and the increase in the mining industry. The MPRP supported a government controlled mineral resources, whilst the Democratic Party advocated private investment. Prior to the election more than 116,000 were listed twice (under different addresses), the General Election Committee affirmed it would be fixed prior to election day. The election saw a turnout of 74% and was stated to be "largely free and fair" by international observers. Early results saw the MPRP having taken 47 seats to the Democratic Party's 27 and the MPRP declared victory. The Democratic Party claimed the election had been fixed by the MPRP with some people voting twice.

Protests
On 1 July a peaceful gathering started in Sukhbaatar Square organized by the leaders of some of the smaller parties that took part in the election. Eventually a large crowd gathered, mainly of young men, surrounding the adjacent MPRP office. The group started throwing rocks at the building and began advancing on it. Police responded with tear gas and non-lethal weapons. In the evening fires were started and looting began. Both the MPRP headquarters and the Central Cultural Palace Building (which houses the National Art Gallery of Mongolia) were set fire by the crowd, estimated to be in the thousands. Art from the gallery (more than 1,000 pieces) were either "destroyed, damaged or looted". In search for weapons a police station was attacked. Looting continued through the night, despite a 10:00 pm – 8:00 am curfew being set in place. Bricks were thrown at a fire engine, and violence in the streets erupted.

A four-day state of emergency, the first in Mongolia's history was declared at by the Mongolian President, effective 11:30 p.m. on 1 July. The state of emergency placed and a ban on the sale of alcohol, authorized police to use force to stop the protesters, and prevented television broadcasts outside of those made by state-run stations. The crowds got smaller after the state of emergency was enacted, and the police were able to use additional force to stop the looting. By 2 July the military was brought into Ulaanbaatar.

The President upheld the fairness of the elections, and promised investigations into the election as required. He also called an emergency national security meeting with the country's prime minister and opposition party leaders. The meeting was broadcast live on privately run Eagle Television, prime minister Sanjaagiin Bayar blamed Democratic Party leader Elbegdorj for "misleading people and inciting violence", echoing claims that he had made earlier that day.

Aftermath

By 3 July, the situation had stabilised, with fewer troops patrolling the streets. Five people were killed in the riots, and over 300 people were injured, both civilian and police. Over 700 arrests were made during the riots, on 7 July more than 200 people were still incarcerated. Allegations of torture of prisoners were brought forward, including one person who was erroneously arrested while trying to preserve a piece of art.

Some commentators and analysts suggested the problems may have been exacerbated by a growing rich/poor divide. Luvsandendev Sumati, from the polling organisation Sant Maral Foundation is reported as saying that "the outskirts of Ulaanbaatar have a lot of poor and frustrated youngsters who would use any pretext to get to streets and participate in any turmoil". A change from a first-past-the-post election process may have led to a misunderstanding over how a winner is selected.

References

Riot in Mongolia, 2008
Riot in Mongolia, 2008
July 2008 events in Asia
Political history of Mongolia
Protests against results of elections
Protests in Mongolia
Riots and civil disorder in Mongolia